Emdadul Haque also spelled imdadul Haque is a Bangladeshi Awami League politician and the former Member of Parliament from Thakurgaon-3.

Career
Emdadul Haque or Amdadul Haque was elected to parliament from Thakurgaon as a candidate of Bangladesh Awami League . He lost the next election to Hafiz Uddin Ahmed in 2011. He was nominated for the 2018 election by Bangladesh Awami League from Thakurgaon-3. He is the senior Vice-President of Bangladesh Awami League Thakurgaon District unit.

Referencement

Awami League politicians
Living people
7th Jatiya Sangsad members
Year of birth missing (living people)